El Porvenir Airport  is an airport serving the towns of Sabá and El Porvenir in Colón Department, Honduras.

There is nearby rising terrain west of the airport.

See also

 Transport in Honduras
 List of airports in Honduras

References

External links
 OpenStreetMap - El Porvenir
 FallingRain - El Porvenir Airport
 HERE Maps - El Porvenir
 OurAirports - El Porvenir

Airports in Honduras